The National Egg Toss Championship is an annual egg tossing contest held by the Hagerstown Suns. The first event was held in 2005.

Champions
2005 Jason Rhea and Naoyuki Mizuguchi

2011 Wells Winegar and Yaj Jacobs

References

Competitions